Harold Edwards may refer to:
 Harold Edwards (mathematician) (1936–2020), American mathematician
 Harold Edwards (RCAF officer) (1892–1952), Canadian Air Force officer
 Harold Edwards (rugby league) (1909–1993), Welsh rugby league footballer
 Harold C. Edwards (1899–1989), British surgeon
 Harold Leslie Edwards (1893–1951), Canadian World War I flying ace

See also 
 Harry Edwards (disambiguation)